Joaquim Márcio Gonçalves Moreira (born 24 June 1990) is a Portuguese professional futsal player who plays for AD Fundão and the Portugal national team as a winger.

References

External links

1990 births
Living people
Sportspeople from Matosinhos
Portuguese men's futsal players
AR Freixieiro players